The 1980 season was Djurgårdens IF's 80th in existence, their 35th season in Allsvenskan and their 19th consecutive season in the league. They were competing in Allsvenskan, 1979–80 Svenska Cupen, and 1980–81 Svenska Cupen.

Player statistics
Appearances for competitive matches only.

|}

Goals

Total

Allsvenskan

Svenska Cupen

Competitions

Overall

Allsvenskan

League table

Matches

Svenska Cupen

1979–80

1980–81

Friendlies

References

Djurgardens
Djurgårdens IF Fotboll seasons